The 2019 ITTF-Oceania Cup was a table tennis event that took place from 25–26 May in Bora Bora, French Polynesia. The competition was organised by ITTF-Oceania, under the authority of the International Table Tennis Federation (ITTF). It was the 11th edition of the event, and the first time that it had been held in French Polynesia. Men's singles and women's singles competitions were held, with the winner of each event qualifying automatically for the 2019 Men's and Women's World Cups.

The ninth edition of the Pacific Cup was also held during the event, with players from Australia and New Zealand excluded from competing.

Medallists

Players

A total of 16 players were invited to compete: eight men and eight women.

Men's singles

 Rohan Dhooria
 Hu Heming
 Dean Shu
 Nathan Xu
 Ocean Belrose
 Vicky Wu
 Arthur Mas
 Yoshua Shing

Women's singles

 Sally Yee
 Jian Fang Lay
 Grace Yee
 Melveen Richmond
 Parleen Kaur
 Cheng Zhiying
 Cyrine Sam
 Zhou Jiayi

Men's singles

Group stage

Knockout stage

Women's singles

Group stage

Knockout stage

Pacific Cup

Men

Women

See also

2019 Europe Top 16 Cup
2019 ITTF-ATTU Asian Cup
2019 ITTF Pan-America Cup

References

External links

ITTF-Oceania website

ITTF-Oceania Cup
Oceania Cup
ITTF-Oceania Cup
International sports competitions hosted by French Polynesia
ITTF-Oceania Cup